Tracy Arm is a fjord in Alaska near Juneau (outlet at 57° 46' 40" N  133° 37' 0" W). It is named after the Secretary of the Navy Benjamin Franklin Tracy. Tracy Arm is the heart of the Tracy Arm-Fords Terror Wilderness, designated by the United States Congress in 1990

Tracy Arm-Fords Terror Wilderness contains  and consists of two deep and narrow fjords: Tracy Arm and Endicott Arm. During the summer, the fjords have considerable floating ice ranging from hand-sized to pieces as large as a three-story building. During the most recent glaciated period, both fjords were filled with active glaciers.

Access
The most common access is by boat using Stephens Passage and entering Holkham Bay and Tracy and Endicott Arms. Float planes from Juneau and Petersburg are also used as a means of access. Large tour vessels and smaller commercial cruise boats frequently use Tracy Arm as a tour destination or as a stop along their normal tour routes.

Sawyer Glacier
The twin Sawyer Glaciers, North Sawyer and South Sawyer, are located at the end of Tracy Arm. The wildlife in the area includes black and brown bears, deer, wolves, harbor seals, and a variety of birds, such as Arctic terns and pigeon guillemots. The mountain goats, which are usually found in the higher elevation areas, have been seen near the base of Sawyer Glacier.

Deepwater Emergence

The deep passageways and thin continental shelf leads to unique connections between offshore and inshore waters. The colder water temperature, nutrient-rich upwelling, and strong currents allow for many species that live in deeper water to survive in the shallower waters.

The corals in this area, such as Primnoa pacifica, have contributed to the location being labeled as Habitat Areas of Particular Concern.

References

Bodies of water of Hoonah–Angoon Census Area, Alaska
Bodies of water of Juneau, Alaska
Fjords of Alaska
Landforms of Hoonah–Angoon Census Area, Alaska
Landforms of Juneau, Alaska
Glaciers of Alaska
Glaciers of Hoonah–Angoon Census Area, Alaska
Glaciers of Juneau, Alaska
Protected areas of Hoonah–Angoon Census Area, Alaska
Protected areas of Juneau, Alaska
Tourist attractions in Juneau, Alaska
Wilderness areas of the Tongass National Forest
Glaciers of Unorganized Borough, Alaska